General elections were held in Bosnia and Herzegovina on 18 November 1990, with a second round of voting in the House of Peoples elections on 2 December. These were the final general elections to be held in Bosnia and Herzegovina while it was still a constituent republic of the SFR Yugoslavia.

A presidential election was held to elect candidates to a seven-member republic presidium. Six candidates were elected to represent Bosnia's nations (two each by Bosnian Muslims, Bosnian Serbs, and Bosnian Croats), and a seventh candidate was elected to represent all "others". 

All of the presidential seats were won by parties structured around national lines: the Party of Democratic Action (SDA) won the two Muslim seats, the Serb Democratic Party (SDS) won the two Serb seats, the Croatian Democratic Union (HDZ) won the two Croat seats, and the "other" seat was won by SDA member Ejup Ganić, who ran as a "Yugoslav". Although Fikret Abdić received more votes than any other candidate, he agreed to stand aside and permit fellow SDA member Alija Izetbegović to become president of the presidium.

The Party of Democratic Action also emerged as the largest party in the election for the Assembly of the Socialist Republic of Bosnia and Herzegovina, with 43 of the 130 seats in the Chamber of Citizens and 43 of the 110 seats in the Chamber of Municipalities. Voter turnout was 74.4% for the presidential election, 81.6% for the Chamber of Municipalities election and 77.5% for the Chamber of Citizens election. However, the election was marred by irregularities; in Brčko, Doboj, Nevesinje and Sarajevo there were more votes than registered voters (13,316 registered voters in Brčko but 49,055 votes, 4,771 voters in the Old City of Sarajevo but 28,974 votes).

Results

Presidency (seven members)

Chamber of Citizens

Chamber of Municipalities

References

1990 elections in Yugoslavia
1990 in Bosnia and Herzegovina
Elections in Bosnia and Herzegovina
November 1990 events in Europe
Election and referendum articles with incomplete results